Ian Lister (5 September 1946 – 8 February 2013) was a Scottish professional footballer who played as a winger.

Early life
Lister was born on 5 September 1946 in Kirkcaldy.

Career
Lister played for Smeaton Boys' Club, Aberdeen, Raith Rovers, Dunfermline Athletic, St Mirren, Berwick Rangers and Caledonian. While at Dunfermline Athletic, Lister scored in the 1968 Scottish Cup Final against Hearts, having previously also scored in one of the semi-final matches. He also played youth football for Scotland.

After retiring as a player, Lister became President of Inverness City.

Later life and death
Lister died on 8 February 2013, at the age of 65.

Lister Park
When Inverness City obtained a permanent ground for themselves in Inverness at the Bught Park, the new pitch was named Lister Park in his honour.

References

1946 births
2013 deaths
Scottish footballers
Association football wingers
Aberdeen F.C. players
Raith Rovers F.C. players
Dunfermline Athletic F.C. players
St Mirren F.C. players
Berwick Rangers F.C. players
Caledonian F.C. players
Scottish Football League players
Footballers from Kirkcaldy
Scotland youth international footballers